Dermott is a city in Chicot County, Arkansas, United States. The population was 2,316 at the 2010 census. Dermott was incorporated in 1890.

Dermott was home to the Dermott Crawfish Festival.

Geography
Dermott is located in the northwest corner of Chicot County at  (33.528712, -91.437657). Bayou Bartholomew, a tributary of the Ouachita River, touches the southwest corner of the city. U.S. Route 165 passes southeast of the city center, leading north  to McGehee and south  to Montrose. Arkansas Highway 35 passes through the center of Dermott and leads northwest  to Monticello.

Climate
The climate in this area is characterized by hot, humid summers and generally mild to cool winters.  According to the Köppen Climate Classification system, Dermott has a humid subtropical climate, abbreviated "Cfa" on climate maps.

Demographics

2020 census

As of the 2020 United States Census, there were 2,021 people, 810 households, and 547 families residing in the city.

2010 census
As of the 2010 United States Census, there were 2,889 people living in the city. 77.8% were African American, 20.2% White, 0.1% Native American, 0.7% Asian, 0.1% from some other race and 1.0% from two or more races. 1.0% were Hispanic or Latino of any race.

2000 census
As of the census of 2000, there were 4865 people, 1,216 households, and 824 families living in the city. The racial makeup of the city was 25.24% White, 73.27% Black or African American, 0.15% Native American, 0.30% Asian, 0.06% from other races, and 0.97% from two or more races.  0.76% of the population were Hispanic or Latino of any race.

There were 1,216 households, out of which 29.9% had children under the age of 18 living with them, 36.2% were married couples living together, 27.7% had a female householder with no husband present, and 32.2% were non-families. 28.8% of all households were made up of individuals, and 14.3% had someone living alone who was 65 years of age or older.  The average household size was 2.59 and the average family size was 3.21.

In the city, the population was spread out, with 29.0% under the age of 18, 8.7% from 18 to 24, 24.1% from 25 to 44, 22.5% from 45 to 64, and 15.7% who were 65 years of age or older.  The median age was 36 years. For every 100 females, there were 81.6 males.  For every 100 females age 18 and over, there were 78.6 males.

The median income for a household in the city was $17,857, and the median income for a family was $22,214. Males had a median income of $21,134 versus $17,318 for females. The per capita income for the city was $9,998.  About 25.9% of families and 32.5% of the population were below the poverty line, including 43.0% of those under age 18 and 22.4% of those age 65 or over.

Arts and culture

Annual cultural events

The Dermott Crawfish Festival was one of the oldest festivals in Arkansas. The festival was held annually on the third weekend in May and was sponsored by the Dermott Chamber of Commerce. From 1996 through 2006, the Texas artist Larry D. Alexander, who is a native of Dermott, usually ended  his Arkansas Schools Tours with a two-day art exhibit and print signing there at the festival. The Crawfish Festival was typically a food and music festival. In 2006, a car/truck/rim show was added to the festival. The Crawfish Festival also hosted a carnival during the entire week. Other events included in the festival were the annual Rotary Club pancake breakfast, bingo, a horseshoe pitching contest, an antique tractor show, and multiple cash drawings.

In 2012 the Dermott Chamber of Commerce cancelled the Dermott Crawfish Festival and no longer sponsors this event. Community leaders and African American Business owners formed a committee to continue the Spirit of the community and now host Dermott Community Festival.

Education
Dermott School District operates public schools in the community. Dermott High School's colors are orange and black. They are the home of the Mighty Rams or Rams. The boys basketball teams won state basketball championships in 1986, 1989, 1991 and 1994. For 2012–14, the Dermott Rams belong to the 2A Region 7 West conference. For its first championship in 1986, Dermott went undefeated (35-0) and won the overall state championship, coached by Willie Parker and Leroy Kennedy. The Rams have been in the top in the 2-AA class but have not made a playoff run since 2000, when they made it to the championship game. Dermott has four state championships and numerous regional and tournament championships.

Notable people

Larry D. Alexander, visual artist/writer
Robert L. Hill, founder of the Progressive Farmers and Household Union of America
Art Kaufman, defensive coordinator, California Golden Bears football
Samuel L. Kountz, kidney transplant surgeon
Zilner Randolph, jazz musician

References

External links
Dermott Crawfish Festival
 Encyclopedia of Arkansas History & Culture entry: Dermott (Chicot County)
Dermott Area Chamber of Commerce
Dermott School District

 
Cities in Chicot County, Arkansas
Cities in Arkansas
Populated places established in 1890